The Mianus River is a  river in Westchester County, New York, and Fairfield County, Connecticut, in the United States. It begins in the town of North Castle, New York (east of Armonk) in a series of ponds at about  altitude.  Flowing northeast into the town of Bedford, it abruptly turns south and passes through the Mianus River Gorge, a nature preserve, before entering Stamford, Connecticut, where it is dammed into the Mianus Reservoir, officially known as the Samuel J. Bargh Reservoir ( altitude) of the Greenwich Water Company.  From there, it flows south through Stamford and Greenwich into Long Island Sound, at sea level.

The river flows under the Mianus River Bridge, which is part of Interstate 95, U.S. Route 1, and the Mianus River Railroad Bridge which carries the New Haven Line of Metro-North Railroad. The Mianus flows through parks including the Mianus River State Park (straddling the Stamford/Greenwich border) and Mianus Glen, just to the north in Stamford, as well as Newman Mills Park in North Stamford.

The Mianus Fault runs near the river, pushing rock on the east side down, relative to the west side.

Mianus is a corruption of Mayanno, an Indian chieftain. Mianus has frequently been noted on lists of unusual place names.

See also

List of rivers of Connecticut
List of rivers of New York
Mianus River Gorge

References

External links
Mianus River Gorge Preserve
Mianus River Watershed Council

Rivers of New York (state)
Greenwich, Connecticut
Geography of Stamford, Connecticut
Connecticut placenames of Native American origin
Rivers of Fairfield County, Connecticut
Long Island Sound
Rivers of Connecticut
Rivers of Westchester County, New York